Antoine Mendy (born 27 May 2004) is a French professional footballer who plays as a right-back for Nice.

Career
Mendy is a youth product of Nice since the age of 10, and worked his way up their youth categories. He began his senior career with their reserves in 2021, and signed his first professional contract with the club on 29 September 2022. He made his professional and Ligue 1 with Nice as a late substitute in a 1–1 win over Auxerre on 16 October 2022.

Personal life
Born in France, Mendy is of Senegalese descent.

References

External links
 
 OGC Nice profile
 

2004 births
Living people
Footballers from Marseille
French footballers
French sportspeople of Senegalese descent
OGC Nice players
Ligue 1 players
Championnat National 3 players
Association football fullbacks